Mohamed Ahmed Selim (born 1 April 1998), is an Egyptian footballer who currently plays as a midfielder for Haras El Hodoud.

Career statistics

Club

Notes

References

1998 births
Living people
Egyptian footballers
Egyptian expatriate footballers
Association football midfielders
S.S.D. Pro Sesto players
Tersana SC players
A.C. Legnano players
Stade Tunisien players
Serie D players
Tunisian Ligue Professionnelle 1 players
Egyptian Premier League players
Egyptian expatriate sportspeople in Italy
Expatriate footballers in Italy
Expatriate footballers in Tunisia
Egyptian expatriate sportspeople in Tunisia